Francisco Domene (born 12 February 1960)  is a  Spanish writer, narrator,  novelist, and poet.  He was born in Caniles, Granada, Spain.

Bibliography
Francisco Domene is probably one of the most personal poets of contemporary Spanish literature. He has written poetry, essays, short stories and novels, some of them placed in the genre of literature for young people, science fiction and adventures novels.

Works
Poetry
Sobrevivir. Ed. AUTOR-EDITOR 17. 1986. 
Libro de las horas. Col. Genil. Diputación de Granada. 1991. 
Propósito de enmienda. Kutxa. San Sebastián. 1992. 
Insistencia en las Horas. Ediciones Libertarias. Madrid. 1993. 
Falso Testimonio. (Plaquette) Plataforma por la Cultura Región Murcia / Colectivo Octubre. 1998. 
Falso Testimonio. Col. Julio Nombela. Asociación de Escritores y Artistas Españoles. Madrid. 1.999. 
Arrabalías.  Oikos-Tau. Barcelona. 2000. 
El cristal de las doce. DVD Ediciones. Barcelona. 2001. 

Narrative
La última aventura.(The latest adventure).(Novel) Ed. Anaya, Madrid. 1992. 
El detector de inocentes.(The detector of innocents).(story), Ed. Instituto de Estudios Almerienses Almería. 1.999. 
Ana y el misterio de la Tierra de Mu. (Anna and the mystery of the Land of Mu) (Novel) Ed. Anaya. Madrid, 1.999. 
El asunto Poseidón.(The Poseidon case).(novel) Ed. Anaya. Madrid. 2001. 
Cuentos y leyendas de los dioses griegos.(Stories and legends of the Greek Gods). Editorial Anaya. Madrid. 2010. 
 Arañas en la barriga. (Spiders in the belly.)(Novel) Editorial VICEVERSA. Barcelona. 2011.  
 Ninfas, faunos, unicornios y otros mitos clásicos. (Nymphs, fauns, unicorns and other classical myths) (Novel/story.) Editorial Anaya. Madrid. 2012. 
 Relatos de la Biblia. (Bible stories) Editorial Anaya. Madrid. 2015. 

Test, study
Poesía Actual Almeriense. Ríomardesierto/city council of Almería, 1.992. 
Narrativa Actual Almeriense. Ríomardesierto/city council of Almería, 1.992.

Awards and distinctions
1992: City Irún, for Propósito de enmienda (Purpose for amendment).
1995: Antonio Machado, for Paisaje (Landscape).
1998: Arts and Letters from the Diputación de Almería, for El detector de inocentes story (The detector innocent).
1998: Antonio Oliver Belmas and Award Blas de Otero, for Falso Testimonio (Perjury).
1999: Memorial Laureà Mela, for Arrabalías (Neighborhoods).
2000: Ciudad de Burgos, for El cristal de las doce (The twelve glass).
2016: Finalist of the Andalusia Awardof the Criticism
2016: José Hierro National Poetry Award, for Adjustment of accounts.

External liaisons 
Web Page unofficial of the author
Poem selection and data
Poem selection and data

1960 births
Living people
People from the Province of Granada
Spanish literature
Spanish poets
Spanish biographers
Male biographers
Spanish novelists
Spanish male novelists
Spanish male poets